Nikola Mektić and Antonio Šančić were the defending champions but chose not to defend their title.

Romain Arneodo and Hugo Nys won the title after defeating Mikhail Elgin and Roman Jebavý 4–6, 7–6(7–3), [10–5] in the final.

Seeds

Draw

References
 Main Draw

Antonio Savoldi–Marco Cò – Trofeo Dimmidisì - Doubles
2017 Doubles